Apple Partition Map (APM) is a partition scheme used to define the low-level organization of data on disks formatted for use with 68k and PowerPC Macintosh computers. It was introduced with the Macintosh II.

Disks using the Apple Partition Map are divided into logical blocks, with 512 bytes usually belonging to each block. The first block, Block 0, contains an Apple-specific data structure called "Driver Descriptor Map" for the Macintosh Toolbox ROM to load driver updates and patches before loading from a MFS or HFS partition. Because APM allows 32 bits worth of logical blocks, the historical size of an APM formatted disk using small blocks is limited to 2 TiB.

The Apple Partition Map maps out all space used (including the map) and unused (free space) on disk, unlike the minimal x86 master boot record that only accounts for used non-map partitions.  This means that every block on the disk (with the exception of the first block, Block 0) belongs to a partition.

Some hybrid disks contain both an ISO 9660 primary volume descriptor and an Apple Partition Map, thus allowing the disc to work on different types of computers, including Apple systems.

Intel-based Macs

For accessing volumes, both APM and GPT partitions can be used in a standard manner with Mac OS X Tiger (10.4) and higher. For starting an operating system, PowerPC-based systems can only boot from APM disks whereas Intel-based systems generally boot from GPT disks. Nevertheless, older Intel-based Macs are able to boot from APM, GPT (GUID Partition Table) and MBR (Master Boot Record, using the BIOS-Emulation called EFI-CSM i.e. the Compatibility Support Module provided by EFI).

Intel-based models that came with Mac OS X Tiger (10.4) or Leopard (10.5) preinstalled had to be able to boot from both APM and GPT disks due to the installation media for these universal versions of Mac OS X, which are APM partitioned in order to remain compatible with PowerPC-based systems. However, the installation of OS X on an Intel-based Mac demands a GPT partitioned disk or will refuse to continue, the same way installation on a PowerPC-based system will demand an APM partitioned destination volume. Cloning an already installed OS X to an APM partition on Intel systems will remain bootable even on 2011 Intel-based Macs. Despite this apparent APM support, Apple never officially supported booting from an internal APM disk on an Intel-based system. The one exception for a universal version of Mac OS X (Tiger or Leopard) is an official Apple document describing how to set up a dual bootable external APM disk for use with PowerPC and Intel.

Layout
Each entry of the partition table is the size of one data block, which is normally 512 bytes. Each partition entry on the table is the size of one block or sector of data. Because the partition table itself is also a partition, the size of this first partition limits the number of entries to the partition table itself.

The normal case is that 64 sectors (64 × 512 = 32 KB) are used by the Apple Partition Map: one block for the Driver Descriptor Map as Block 0, one block for the partition table itself and 62 blocks for a maximum of 62 data partitions.

Each partition entry includes the starting sector and the size, but also a name, a type, a position of the data area and possible boot code. It also includes the total number of partitions in that partition table. This ensures that, after reading the first partition table entry, the firmware is aware of how many blocks more to read from the media in order to have processed every partition table entry. All entries are in big-endian byte-order.

Partition identifiers
Types beginning with "Apple_" are reserved for assignment by Apple, all other custom defined types are free to use.  However registration
with Apple is encouraged.

Partition status 
Partition status is a bit field composed of the flags:

See also
 Amiga rigid disk block (RDB)
 BSD disklabel
 Extended boot record (EBR)
 GUID Partition Table (GPT)
 Host protected area (HPA)
 Master boot record (MBR)

References

External links 
 Mac OS: Technical overview of disk volume structures Overview of the elements of a disk volume / partition
 File System Forensic Analysis: PC-based Partitions – Apple partitions Detailed technical analysis of the structure of Apple's partition map.

Apple Inc. file systems
Computer file systems
Disk partitions
MacOS